Boban Dmitrović (born 2 April 1972) is a Serbian former professional footballer who played as a defender.

Club career
Born in Konarevo, a village near Kraljevo, Dmitrović started out at his local club Budućnost Konarevo, before joining Sloga Kraljevo. He made his First League of FR Yugoslavia debut with Rad in the 1993–94 season. In the summer of 1996, Dmitrović moved to Austria to play for Grazer AK. He stayed there for seven seasons, before signing for GAK's crosstown rivals Sturm Graz in May 2003. He appeared in a total of 250 matches in the Austrian Bundesliga, before returning to his homeland and signing with Borac Čačak in the summer of 2005. As captain, Dmitrović led the team to a fourth-place finish in the 2007–08 season, as the club gained a spot in UEFA competitions for the first time in history. At the beginning of 2011, after a dispute with the club's management, Dmitrović left the team after almost six years and 155 matches played in the Serbian SuperLiga. In the summer of 2011, almost two decades later, Dmitrović returned to Sloga Kraljevo, after they got promoted to the Serbian First League. He retired from professional football in the summer of 2012.

International career
In June 2001, Dmitrović made his national team debut in a 1–1 draw against Russia, aged 29. He was capped 13 times for Serbia and Montenegro between 2001 and 2003, under the managerial reign of Dejan Savićević.

Managerial career
After serving as an assistant to Peter Pacult, Ivan Jević and Milan Đuričić, Dmitrović was appointed manager of Radnički Niš in January 2018. He left the position just two months later after suffering two consecutive losses.

Statistics

Club

International

Honours

Club
Grazer AK
 Austrian Cup: 1999–2000, 2001–02
 Austrian Supercup: 2000, 2002

Individual
 Serbian SuperLiga Team of the Season: 2008–09

Personal life
Dmitrović is the father of fellow footballer Filip Dmitrović.

References

External links
 
 

Association football defenders
Austrian Football Bundesliga players
Expatriate footballers in Austria
First League of Serbia and Montenegro players
FK Borac Čačak players
FK Rad players
FK Radnički Niš managers
FK Sloga Kraljevo players
Grazer AK players
Serbia and Montenegro expatriate footballers
Serbia and Montenegro expatriate sportspeople in Austria
Serbia and Montenegro footballers
Serbia and Montenegro international footballers
Serbian football managers
Serbian footballers
Serbian SuperLiga managers
Serbian SuperLiga players
SK Sturm Graz players
Sportspeople from Kraljevo
1972 births
Living people